The Jack Wilson Quartet featuring Roy Ayers is an album by American jazz pianist Jack Wilson recorded for the Atlantic label and released in 1963.

Reception

AllMusic awarded the album 3 stars.

Track listing
All compositions by Jack Wilson except as indicated
 "Corcovado" (Antônio Carlos Jobim) - 4:41
 "Jackleg" - 2:29
 "Blues We Use" - 6:24
 "Harbor Freeway" - 2:55
 "De Critifeux" - 5:56
 "Nirvana & Dana" - 12:46

Personnel 
Jack Wilson - piano
Roy Ayers - vibraphone
Al McKibbon - bass
Nick Martinis - drums

References 

1963 albums
Jack Wilson (jazz pianist) albums
Atlantic Records albums
Albums produced by Nesuhi Ertegun